In Bangladesh, a mridha is a first class commander of armed men under the employ of a zamindar (landlord) in pre British period, used as security guards, against uncooperative tenants, and against the forces of other zamindars in land disputes. During the mughal  era it is considered that a part of Mridha were the elite class archers of mughal archery unit who lived around and within the parts of  Dhaka ,  Tangail and  Bikrampur .

References

Bengali zamindars